is a Japanese footballer who plays as a defender for German club Sportfreunde Baumberg.

Career statistics

Club
.

Notes

References

External links

2003 births
Living people
Japanese footballers
Association football defenders
Cerezo Osaka players
Cerezo Osaka U-23 players
J3 League players
Oberliga (football) players
Japanese expatriate footballers
Expatriate footballers in Germany
Japanese expatriate sportspeople in Germany